Rockford Township is one of fifteen townships in Surry County, North Carolina, United States. The township had a population of 1,780 according to the 2000 census.

Geographically, Rockford Township occupies  in southern Surry County, with its southern border consisting of the Yadkin River.  There are no incorporated municipalities within Rockford Township; however, there are several smaller, unincorporated communities located here, including, Copeland, Level Cross, Rockford and Stony Knoll.

Townships in Surry County, North Carolina
Townships in North Carolina